The Institute for Strategic Dialogue (ISD) is a think tank founded in 2006 by Sasha Havlicek and George Weidenfeld that specialises in research and policy advice on hate, extremism, and disinformation. It is headquartered in London, United Kingdom.

History 

ISD was founded in 2006 as an extension of the Club of Three, a strategic networking organisation founded in 1996 by George Weidenfeld that focused on high-level engagement between Europe and the world. ISD originally focused on social cohesion and radicalisation following a rise of far-right and Islamist extremism in Europe. ISD later hosted the Against Violent Extremism network shortly after it was founded in 2011 in Dublin, Ireland, promoting engagement with former violent extremists as a way of understanding how extremist movements work.

By 2012, ISD was working with social media platforms such as YouTube to explore radicalisation online, including research on the use of counternarratives to minimise the impact of extremist recruitment by groups such as ISIS, Al Qaeda, and white supremacists in Europe and North America. This work later expanded to include recruitment and disruption efforts by state actors and conspiracy theorists during the Covid-19 pandemic. Much of this activity was found to be amplified during regional and national elections, leading to new research on election disruption in countries such as Germany, Sweden, France, Italy, Kenya, and the United States. By 2020, the Institute became the largest organisation in the world with an exclusive focus on the study of and responses to extremism, independently convening 13 countries and the European Union on extremism and digital policy on a regular basis. ISD's analysis of the January 6th United States Capitol attack was chosen for inclusion in the Library of Congress. 

From 2017, ISD began establishing regional offices in Amman (2017), Nairobi (2018), Berlin (2019), Paris (2020), and Washington, D.C. (2021).

Programmes and activities 

ISD’s core activities range from traditional research output and policy advice to the facilitation of youth and practitioner networks and the development of counternarrative and technological tools to combat extremism. More recently, ISD has researched misinformation and disinformation involving climate change, public health, election integrity, and conspiracy networks such as QAnon. 

Key ISD programmes include:

Current 

 Business Council for Democracy (BC4D): A joint initiative from Hertie Stiftung, Robert Bosch Stiftung and ISD Germany, BC4D provides a business-led approach to digital literacy for adults, including employee training on hate speech, disinformation and conspiracy theories.
 Digital Policy Lab (DPL): Funded by the German Federal Foreign Office, the DPL is an intergovernmental working group focused on regulation and policy regarding disinformation, hate speech, extremism and terrorism online.
 Beam: Developed in partnership with the Centre for Analysis of Social Media (CASM), Beam is a meta-project that uses tech to detect, track & measure online manipulation, disinformation, and harassment. Beam was a winner of the 2021 U.S.-Paris Tech Challenge.
 Prevention Practitioner Network: Developed in partnership with the McCain Institute, the Prevention Practitioner Network is a national network of interdisciplinary professionals dedicated to preventing targeted violence, terrorism and their impacts within the United States.
 Strong Cities Network (SCN): Launched at the United Nations in September 2015, SCN is a global network of mayors, municipal-level policy-makers and practitioners seeking to build social cohesion and countering violent extremism.
 Youth Civil Activism Network (YouthCAN): Launched in Oslo, Norway in 2015, YouthCAN is a global youth network of counter-extremism and social justice activists.
 Be Internet Citizens (BIC): Developed in partnership with Google in 2017, BIC is a digital literacy programme for youth that aims to explain fake news, echo chambers, filter bubbles, and promote safety online.
 Shared Endeavour Fund: ISD managed an £800,000 fund, supported Google.org and the Mayor of London, to empower communities to tackle violent extremism and a rise in hate crime offences in London.
ISD is also a member of the Christchurch Call advisory network and the Commission for Countering Extremism's Expert Group in the United Kingdom.

Past 

 The Far-Right Extremism in Europe (FREE) Initiative: FREE is an online resource for practitioners responding to far-right extremism and violence.
 Against Violent Extremism (AVE) network: A global network of former extremists, survivors of violence and interested individuals working together to counter all forms of violent extremism.
 Extreme Dialogue: A multi-media education resource for teachers and social workers featuring stories from former extremists and survivors of extremism.
 Counter Conversations: Developed as a research project with Facebook, this initiative facilitates interventions between former extremists and young people who show serious extremist tendencies.
 Online Civil Courage Initiative (OCCI): A strategic partnership with Facebook, OCCI launched in Germany in 2016 and expanded to France and the UK in 2017. OCCI helps develop new responses to hate speech and violent extremism on social media, providing resources that are often unavailable to grassroots activist organisations.
 Policy Planners’ Network (PPN): A European inter-governmental network of policy chiefs from integration and interior ministries working to develop upgraded, coordinated responses to integration and extremism.
 Innovation Fund to Counter Extremism: Launched with Google.org in 2017, this fund distributed £1M to support organisations countering hate, racism, and extremism in the UK.
 Google Impact Challenge on Safety: Launched with Google.org and Ashoka in 2019, this fund distributed €10M to support organisations across Europe countering hate, extremism and supporting child safety online.
ISD previously chaired the EU's Radicalisation Awareness Network (RAN) working group on the Internet and social media and has provided testimony to the US Committee on House Administration, the US Committee on Foreign Affairs, and the UK Home Affairs Select Committee.

Funding and partnerships 

ISD partners with a number of Western governments, including agencies in Canada, Norway, the Netherlands, Germany, the United Kingdom, New Zealand, Australia, the United States, and the European Commission. It also works on funded projects with technology companies and organisations such as Google, Microsoft, Meta, and the Global Internet Forum to Counter Terrorism. 

Notable sources of foundation support include the Bill & Melinda Gates Foundation, the Omidyar Network, the Gen Next Foundation, and the Open Society Foundation. Other institutional partners include the Global Disinformation Index, the Berkman Klein Center for Internet & Society, Institut Montaigne, the British Council, and the German Marshall Fund.

Notable publications 
 Ayad, Moustafa, "The Vladimirror Network: Pro-Putin Power-Users on Facebook" (April 2022)
 O'Connor, Ciaran, "Hatescape: An In-Depth Analysis of Extremism and Hate Speech on TikTok" (August 2021)
 Comerford, Milo; Havlicek, Sasha, "Mainstreamed Extremism and the Future of Prevention" (September 2021)
 "Bankrolling Bigotry: An overview of the Online Funding Strategies of American Hate Groups" (October 2020)
 Miller, Carl; Smith, Melanie, Marsh, Oliver; Balint, Kata; Inskip, Chris; Visser, Francesca, "Information Warfare and Wikipedia" (October 2022)

References

External links
 

Foreign policy and strategy think tanks based in the United Kingdom
International organisations based in London